Khizanishvili is a Georgian surname. Notable people with the surname include:

Nodar Khizanishvili (born 1953), Soviet footballer
Zurab Khizanishvili (born 1981), Georgian footballer and coach

Georgian-language surnames